Brian Gottfried and Raúl Ramírez were the defending champions but lost in the semifinals to Gene Mayer and Hank Pfister.

Gene Mayer and Hank Pfister won in the final 6–3, 6–2, 6–2 against José Higueras and Manuel Orantes.

Seeds

Draw

Finals

Top half

Section 1

Section 2

Bottom half

Section 3

Section 4

References

External links
1978 French Open – Men's draws and results at the International Tennis Federation

Men's Doubles
French Open by year – Men's doubles